In Liechtenstein there is no national association football league. The seven clubs play in the Swiss football league system.

List of clubs

See also
Liechtenstein Football Cup
List of top-division football clubs in Liechtenstein (and other UEFA member countries)

 
Liechtenstein
clubs

Football clubs